Taulant Kuqi (born 11 November 1985 in Vlorë) is an Albanian professional footballer who plays as a midfielder for Oriku in the Albanian First Division.

Club career
An Flamurtari Vlorë product, Kuqi debuted during 2005–06 season and since then played more than 250 league appearances, notably winning Albanian Cup twice. On 22 July 2012, Kuqi agreed a contract extension, signing until June 2013.

He left the club after 15 years in June 2017.

After two months of negotiations, on 1 September 2017, Kuqi agreed personal terms and joined newly promoted side Kazma. Priror to that, he had a failed move to Albanian First Division's Bylis Ballsh. He was a regular starter in the team during the 2017–18 season in which Kamza escaped relegation by only winning in the final match, with Kuqi collecting 2313 minutes from 31 appearances.

In July 2018, Kuqi along with Argjent Halili joined newly promoted Albanian First Division side Oriku.

Career statistics

Honours
Flamurtari Vlorë
 Albanian Cup: 2008–09, 2013–14

References

External links
FSHF profile

1985 births
Living people
Footballers from Vlorë
Albanian footballers
Association football midfielders
Flamurtari Vlorë players
FC Kamza players
KF Oriku players
Kategoria Superiore players
Kategoria e Parë players